Torrey Ward (July 7, 1978 – April 7, 2015) was an American assistant coach of men's college basketball.  An undrafted 6'3" (1.90 m) guard from the University of Alabama-Birmingham, Ward played professionally in China for several years before starting his coaching career as a volunteer at Jacksonville State University in 2003. Ward became an assistant at JSU before being hired to Andy Kennedy's staff at Ole Miss. After five seasons with the Rebels, Ward spent two years as an assistant to Dan Muller at Illinois State University. Prior to the 2014–15 season, Muller promoted Ward to associate head coach.

While returning from the 2015 NCAA championship game in Indianapolis, Ward was one of seven people killed in a plane crash just outside Illinois State's main campus.

Playing career
Ward attended University of Alabama at Birmingham, his hometown school, and played for three seasons (1997–2000) under head coach Murry Bartow. He was not drafted into the NBA, instead playing two seasons in the Chinese Basketball Association. Ward was a teammate of future NBA star Yao Ming with the Shanghai Sharks.

Coaching career
In 2003, Ward joined Mike LaPlante's staff as a volunteer coach at Jacksonville State University. He then spent the next two seasons as an assistant coach for the Gamecocks before getting hired by Andy Kennedy at the University of Mississippi. After five seasons with the Rebels, Ward moved onto Illinois State University in Normal, Illinois. Ward spent two seasons as an assistant before being promoted to associate head coach in May 2014.

Death
Ward was killed in a plane crash on April 7, 2015. He was a passenger in a Cessna 414 flying back to Illinois State when the aircraft crashed overnight just two miles east of Central Illinois Regional Airport in Bloomington, Illinois. Also among the seven passengers killed in the crash was ISU deputy athletic director Aaron Leetch. The plane was flying from Indianapolis, Indiana, where Ward had attended the 2015 National Championship Game at Lucas Oil Stadium. Ward was survived by his two children.

References

1978 births
2015 deaths
Accidental deaths in Illinois
Basketball coaches from Alabama
American expatriate basketball people in China
Basketball players from Birmingham, Alabama
American men's basketball players
Shandong Hi-Speed Kirin players
Illinois State Redbirds men's basketball coaches
Jacksonville State Gamecocks men's basketball coaches
Ole Miss Rebels men's basketball coaches
Shanghai Sharks players
Sportspeople from Birmingham, Alabama
UAB Blazers men's basketball players
Victims of aviation accidents or incidents in the United States
Guards (basketball)
Victims of aviation accidents or incidents in 2015